Sierra de la Demanda is a comarca located south-east of the province of Burgos in the autonomous community of Castile and León, Spain. It is bounded on the north-east by the Montes de Oca comarca, north-west by the Alfoz de Burgos, south-east by the province of Soria, south-west by the Ribera del Duero comarca, on the east by the province of La Rioja and west by the Arlanza comarca. It is named after the mountain sub-range of Sierra de la Demanda, the northwesternmost end of the Sistema Ibérico.

Administrative entities
The comarca capital and biggest town is Salas de los Infantes.

Municipalities
There are 39 municipalities. In parentheses is the number of minor local entities within each municipality.

See also

 Province of Burgos

Notes

External links
 website of the Province of Burgos delegation

Comarcas of the Province of Burgos